Pib and Pog is the name of both a short film and a series of shorts created by Aardman Animations.

The animation is set up like a typical pre-school programme, introduced by a soft-spoken narrator who translates what the characters say to the audience. However, as the show goes on, it gradually turns into a black comedy where the characters attempt to harm each other constantly - like shooting each other in the stomach with guns, kicking each other in the buttocks, sticking each other's heads in concentrated sulphuric acid, sawing each other in half and blowing each other up with cannons. After the show has finished, the "actors" (the same characters with a more worn-out expression) break character and reveal themselves to be much older and grumpier than the characters they portray.

The characters were later used in an advertising campaign for Dairylea products on UK television, and made a cameo in the eighth episode of Rex the Runt.

Short film (1995) 
Pib and Pog is a 6-minute animated short film made by Peter Peake for Aardman Animations which originally aired on Channel 4 in 1995.

Cast 
Joanna Wake as the Narrator
Andrew Wilson as Pib and Pog (noise)
Peter Peake as the Director
Nigel Betts as Pib (talking)
Roy Macready as Pog (talking)

Critical reception 
Pib and Pog received a rating of 7.3/10 from 263 users on IMDb.

Awards and nominations 
This is a list of awards and nominations of Pib and Pog.

|-
| 1995
|Carla Shelley and Peter Peake 
| BAFTA Film Award for Best Short Animated Film
| 
|-
| 1995
| Peter Peake
| Edinburgh International Film Festival award for Best New British Animation
| 
|}

Series (2006) 
In 2006, five additional shorter episodes were made in association with the BBC and were available to watch online at AtomFilms until it was absorbed into Comedy Central. Like the original short, the episodes are set up like a typical pre-school program, introduced by a soft-spoken narrator who translates what the characters say to the audience. However, as each episode goes on, it gradually turns into a black comedy where the characters attempt to harm each other constantly - like removing a rotten tooth then filling Pog's mouth shut, finding chocolate that makes Pib sick that Pog staples Pib's mouth shut but Pib barfs through his eyes, auditioning to become a contestant on the X Factor and Pog playing Simon Cowell, Pog giving Pib negative feedback with Pib blowing Pog's head off with a microphone, letting Pib lick the whisk he used to make a cake with and Pib's tongue gets stuck in it. Pib then proceeding to cut Pog's face off with a knife with it landing in the cake, and finding a porno DVD in Daddy's study, watching some of the film with Pib throwing the disc with it piercing Pog's head. All Pib and Pog episodes can now be seen on YouTube as of August 2012.

Cast 
Joanna Wake as the Narrator
Andrew Wilson as Pib and Pog (noise)

Episodes 
Dentist
Too many sweets had taken their toll on Pog so Pib turns to dentistry and removes the tooth then fills Pog's mouth shut.

Peter's Room
Pib and Pog find chocolate that makes Pib sick so Pog staples Pib's mouth shut but Pib vomits through his eyes.

X Factor
Pib auditions to become a contestant on The X Factor and Pog plays Simon Cowell. Pog gives Pib negative feedback then Pib blows Pog's head off with a microphone.

The Kitchen
Pog lets Pib lick the whisk he used to make a cake with and Pib's tongue gets stuck in it. Pib then cuts Pog's face off with a knife and it lands in the cake.

Daddy's Study
Pib and Pog find a porno DVD in Daddy's study. They watch some of the film then Pib throws the disc and it pierces Pog's head.

References

External links 

1995 films
Aardman Animations
Television series by Aardman Animations
British animated short films
1990s English-language films
1990s British films